The Government College of Engineering  Poonjar (established in 2000), is an engineering institute in the state of Kerala, India. Till completion of 2014 Admissions, the college was affiliated to Cochin University of Science and Technology and currently since 2015 it is affiliated to the APJ Abdul Kalam Technological University and the courses are recognised by the All India Council for Technical Education.

Overview 
College of Engineering, Poonjar is established by the Institute of Human Resources Development (IHRD). As the 5th Engineering College of IHRD after Model Engineering College, College of Engineering Chengannur, College of Engineering Adoor and College of Engineering Karunagappally. College of Engineering, Poonjar started functioning in 2000.

About 
The institute offers four year B.Tech. degree courses in Electronics and Communication Engineering, Computer Science and Engineering and Electrical and Electronics Engineering. Each branch has an annual intake of 60 students. The admission is based on the merit list in the Kerala State Common Entrance Test (CET).
This institution has a very neat canteen facility available run by the P.T.A. The institution owns two hostels for girls at Poonjar (Ganga hostel) and Erattupetta (Nila hostel) and is directly managed by the college.

Senate
First Senate was formed in 2001 and the members are

 Chairman : Aneesh Abhraham
 V.Chairman : Lakshmi S Pillai
 Secretary : Nobert Henry
 University Union Councilor: Praveen.M.S
 Arts Club Secretary : Sherin Maria Sebastian
 Magazine Editor : Simy S Nair

The recent Senate came into existence in 2016 www.cep.ac.in/index.php/senate

Courses 
 B.Tech Degree in Computer Science and Engineering
 B.Tech Degree in Electronics and Communication Engineering
 B.Tech Electrical & Electronics Engineering
 M.Tech Computer Science (Computer and Information Science)
 M.Tech Electronics (Signal Processing)

See also
List of Engineering Colleges in Kerala

References

External links
Official website
http://www.cee-kerala.org/
Cochin University of Science And Technology Official website
The Institute of Human Resource Development Kerala Official website
Facebook Community
Facebook Group

Engineering colleges in Kerala
All India Council for Technical Education
Institute of Human Resources Development
Universities and colleges in Kottayam district
Educational institutions established in 2000
2000 establishments in Kerala